Roseleine Joseph (born 5 December 1986) is a Haitian former footballer. She has been a member of the Haiti women's national team.

Club career
Joseph has played for Aigle d'Or in Haiti.

International career
Joseph capped for Haiti at senior level during the 2012 CONCACAF Women's Olympic Qualifying Tournament qualification.

International goals
Scores and results list Haiti' goal tally first.

References

1986 births
Living people
Haitian women's footballers
Haiti women's international footballers
Women's association footballers not categorized by position